Li Su-min (born 1 August 1974) is a North Korean figure skater. He competed in the men's singles event at the 1992 Winter Olympics.

References

1974 births
Living people
North Korean male single skaters
Olympic figure skaters of North Korea
Figure skaters at the 1992 Winter Olympics
Place of birth missing (living people)